Saint-Martin-de-Fugères is a commune in the Haute-Loire department in south-central France.

Population

Sights
The Robert Louis Stevenson Trail (GR 70), a popular long-distance path, runs through the village.

See also
Communes of the Haute-Loire department

References

Communes of Haute-Loire